Shiremark Mill, also known as Kingsfold Mill or Capel Mill was a listed Smock mill at Capel, Surrey, England, which was burnt down in 1972.

History

Shiremark Mill was built in 1774, incorporating some material from a demolished  open trestle post mill which had stood at Clark's Green (TQ 176 398).

The mill was offered for sale in 1777, described as "new-built" and in 1802 was acquired by the Stone family, who were to work it until 1919. In 1886, the mill was tailwinded and the cap and sails were blown off. Messrs Grist and Steele, the Horsham millwrights replaced them that year. The mill worked by wind until 1919, when it was stopped on account of a defective curb.

Shiremark Mill slowly became derelict, an inspection by Rex Wailes in 1933 resulted in an estimated repair cost of £100. The cap boarding was repaired but the mill was again left to deteriorate. In 1950, Capel Parish Council approached the Society for the Protection of Ancient Buildings and the owner of the mill with a view to securing the mill's preservation. The mill had been listed as an antiquity by Surrey County Council by 1951. In 1952, a detailed inspection of the mill found that the sills and lower part of the cant posts were rotten. Thompson's, the Alford millwrights estimated that the mill would cose £2,500 to restore. The main beams of the first floor were supported by brick piers, but no other work was done. Although the mill had all four sails in 1928, the sails fell off one by one, with the last falling in 1956. Photographs show that the cap was intact in August 1958, but by May 1966 the roof had gone, exposing the brake wheel to the weather.

Description

Shiremark Mill was a three-storey smock mill on a single-storey base. There was no stage, earth having been thrown up against the base to form a mill mound. It last worked with four double Patent sails carried on a cast-iron windshaft. The cap was winded by a hand wheel.

Base

By 2006 the base was the only remaining part of the mill, although largely hidden by dense undergrowth.

Smock

There were two sets of  square oak transoms at appropriate heights which carried the joists for the internal floors. Each of the twenty-four frames was infilled with a vertical oak post  square and two diagonal struts  in section. On the bottom floor of the smock there were two doors on opposite sides to enable access whatever direction the sails were facing.

Internally, the bottom floor of the smock was at two levels, with a  height difference. These formed the base of the Hurst Frame, a feature more commonly found in watermills than windmills. Shiremark mill is the only recorded windmill with a hurst frame south of the River Thames. A surviving windmill with a hurst frame is Chesterton Mill, Warwickshire.

Cap

The main cross members were the breast beam, the sprattle beam and the tail beam, in order from head to tail. The cross members extended each side of the sheers to form a base for the nine pairs of roof rafters. There was no ridge board to the roof.

The cap was winded by a hand wheel of  diameter housed just inside the rear of the cap. The worm wheel that engaged with the cogs set into the top of the tower was latterly a cast-iron one, replacing an earlier wooden one.

Sails and windshaft

The mill was built with four Common sails. After it was tailwinded in 1886, a new cap, windshaft and four double Patent sails were fitted.

It was  diameter at the neck bearing,  square at the boss for the brake wheel and  diameter at the tail, the tail bearing itself being  diameter. The windshaft carried a  diameter clasp arm Brake wheel, which had been converted from compass arm construction, the original windshaft having been of wood. The brake wheel had 75 cogs. The windshaft from Shiremark Mill was used in the restoration of Ripple Mill, Ringwould, Kent in 1994.

Machinery

It replaced an earlier wooden wheel. The underside of the wallower had a friction ring which drove the sack hoist. At the foot of the Upright Shaft, a wooden clasp arm Great Spur Wheel of  diameter with 70 cogs was carried. This drove the two pairs of millstones underdrift. The French Burr stones were driven by a stone nut with 20 cogs, and the Peak stones were driven by a stone nut with 18 cogs. Each pair of millstones was controlled by its own governor, missing at the time of the survey in 1952.

Millers

David Southow, 1774–1777
John Stone, 1802–
Thomas Stone
G. Stone
Eliza Stone
John Chantler,  1875
William Rapley, 1886
George Stone, 1919

Reference:

Culture and literature

Hilaire Belloc mentions Shiremark Mill in the preface to The Four Men.

References

External links

Windmill World webpage on Shiremark mill.

Smock mills in England
Grinding mills in the United Kingdom
Windmills completed in 1774
Listed buildings in Surrey
Windmills in Surrey
Octagonal buildings in the United Kingdom
Buildings and structures demolished in 1972
Listed windmills in the United Kingdom